Astro Mustika HD was a television channel by the Malaysian satellite provider Astro. It was the first in-house channel by Astro for telenovelas, movies, specials, telemovie & reality in High Definition in Malaysia. Astro Mustika HD was included in the network's Mustika Pack.

When it launched on 21 May 2012 , it broadcast original programs and contents from almost all of Astro's Malay channels, but programs from channels such as Astro Ria, Astro Prima and most other channels were moved to Astro Maya HD when it launched on 24 June 2013. Despite this, some programs such as The Band were broadcast on this channel, although they were also shown on Astro Ria for the SD version. Astro Ria would start broadcasting their own HD channel on 29 May 2015. Since then, most of their content broadcast were simulcast with other channels within the Mustika package. The content of Astro Warna were moved to its own HD channel when it began broadcasting on 11 May 2017, including their older programs. They continued to broadcast content from Astro Bella until the last programs simulcast with this channel during April–May 2018, leaving the channel to focus on Astro Citra. Starting 1 October 2018, this channel changed its name to Astro Citra HD and moved to channel 126 instead.

Current programmes

Original series
 Jodoh Itu Milik Kita (also aired on Astro Maya HD for first three episodes)
 Bukan Kerana Aku Tak Cinta (also aired on Astro Bella)
 Kusinero Cinta (also aired on Astro Bella)
 Bercakap Dengan Jin (also aired on Astro Bella)
 Keluarga Karaoke (also aired on Astro Bella and KL TV)

Telenovelas
 El secretario
 Infamia (Torn Apart)
 Quererte Asi
 The Force of Destiny

Comedy shows
 Super Spontan 2013
 Karoot Komedia X S2
 Maharaja Lawak Mega 2013
 Maharaja Lawak Mega 2014 (also aired on Astro Warna)
 Sembang Teh Tarik
 Betul ke Bohong?
 Redah Kasi Pecah Ekstravaganza

Reality shows
 Fear Factor Selebriti Malaysia (also aired on Astro Ria, second season shown on Astro Maya HD)
 Maharaja Lawak Mega
 Maharaja Lawak Mega 2012
 Maharaja Lawak Mega 2013
 Maharaja Lawak Mega 2014
 Super Spontan
 Super Spontan 2013
 Super Spontan 2014 The Band (also aired on Astro Ria)
 Juara JoranMovies
 3 Temujanji 3, 2, 1 Cinta 8 Jam Abang Long Fadil Adnan Sempit 2 Adnan Sempit 3 Adnan Sempit Sawadikap Aku Masih Dara Alamak Toyol! Anak Jantan Bencinta Bini-biniku Gangster CEO Cerita Kita Dampak Damping Malam Dollah Superstar Flat 3A Hantu Bonceng Hantu Dalam Botol Kicap Hikayat Merong Mahawangsa Kaki Kitai Kami Histeria Kembar Siang Keramat Kisah Pailing Gangster KL Gangster 2 Lari Langgar Longkai Lu, Gua, Bro! Kongsi: Lu Langsi, Lu Mati Mat Tudung Ngangkung Ombak Rindu Pada Suatu Cinta Dahulu Paku Paku Pontianak Papa, I Love You Sembunyi Sejoli: Misi Cantas Cinta Sekali Lagi Senario The Movie: Ops Pocot Sniper Suatu Malam Kubur Berasap Suatu Malam Kubur Berasap 2 Sumpahan Kum Kum Tokan Ular Untuk Tiga Hari Ustaz, Mu Tunggu Aku Datang!Telemovies
 7 Lagu Asmara Beijing Bersalji di Kuala Lumpur Dan Sebenarnya Dendam Maya Hatiku di Kinabalu Jauh Jangan Pergi Diriku Kabut Ungu Kampungku Ada Hantu Kau Untukku Kubur Tak Tertanda Love, Nora Panggilan Arwah Parit Jawa Parut Asyikin Selagi Masih Ada Pengancam Perkahwinan Menantu CantikEntertainment news
 MeleTOP (also aired on Astro Ria, moved to Astro Maya HD)
 PropaganzaOthers
 Entri Jameela Fadzilah Kamsah – Selami Jiwa S2 Muzik Video Primadona (also aired on Astro Prima, moved to Astro Maya HD)
 RM 1,000,000 Money Drop S2 Specials/Entertainment special 

Current affairs
 #TrekPMVariety
 Aaron & Zizan... Beraya Sampai Pengsan Destinasi Prihatin Ustazah Pilihan 2012 Imam Muda S2 Akhir Jejak Imam Muda 2012 Kemah Keming Ustaz Azhar Idrus: 25 Rasul Kemah Keming Ustaz Azhar Idrus: Nabi Terakhir Konsert Kotak: Tendangan Dari Langit Konsert Wings: Best of Rock Konsert Kenangan Sudirman Konsert Kilauan Emas Aidilfitri Konsert Reunion Pop Yeh Yeh Konsert T.R.I.A.D. Kuala Lumpur International Music & Light Festival 2012 Konsert MANIA Final Lawak Ke, Der? Maharaja Lawak Mega Final Melatah Raya 2012 Mega Raya 2012 Propaganza Raya Raya Rayau Aznil Superstar: Episod Kemuncak (LIVE) Ustazah Pilihan S1 Akhir Walimatulurus: Diana Danielle & Farid Kamil Warna Raya 2012Musical dramas
 Lemang SebatangSports
 Era Piala Malaysia 2012 Akhir: ATM FA lwn. Kelantan FAAward shows
 Anugerah Industri Muzik (AIM 19) (LIVE) Di Sebalik Tabir AIM 19 Karpet Glamor AIM 19 Formerly programmes 

Original series
 Adam & Hawa Sehangat Asmara Dahlia Jodoh Itu Milik Kita Bukan Kerana Aku Tak Cinta Kusinero Cinta Keluarga KaraokeCookery programme
 Helo Bro... Tolong Masak Helo Bro... Tolong Masak Raya Ni!Comedy
 Betul ke Bohong? Karoot Komedia X Karoot Komedia X Raya Kembang Sa-Taman Oh My English! Onyomat Geset Go Opera Sabun BoBoi Sepahtu: Angan Tak Sudah Roda Igauan Elak ElakDrama
 Pengantin Untuk Dijual Tanah KeramatReality
 Imam Muda (S3) Karpet Kilauan Emas (S2) Kaspul Kilauan Emas (S2) Konsert Akhir Kilauan Emas (S2) MasterChef Selebriti Malaysia MasterChef Malaysia (S2) Pentas Kilauan Emas (S2) Ramalan Super Spontan Akhir Super Spontan Semi-final Super Spontan FinalSinetron
 InsyaAllah Ada JalanTelenovela
 Emperatriz Forever Yours Pasion Morena Pobre Diabla''

See also 
 Astro B.yond

References

External links 
 
 Astro Mustika HD TV Guide

Television in Malaysia